Monish Gujral (born August 31, 1965) is an Indian Columnist, Restaurateur, Chef, Author, and Food blogger, and talk show host. He is the chairman of Moti Mahal. He is a Member managing Committee, NRAI- National restaurant committee of India. He is the countries foremost food- writers and has bee columnist with leading newspapers- HT City, The Hindu and at present he is the columnist with the new Indian express. He is the first Indian chef invited to the legendary institute the cordon bleu in Paris to demonstrate Indian culinary. He has hosted many cookeries shows on television for NDTV and Doordarshan. Recently He hosted T.V serial called "Health Mange More" on FOOD FOOD channel.

Early life 
Monish Gujral was born in a famous Hindu Punjabi family. The family has been credited with placing India on the world culinary map. His legendary Grandfather Kundan Lal Gujral was an Indian Chef and restaurateur and who establish the Moti Mahal chain of restaurant

Achievements 
He is credited for expanding the Moti Mahal chain from a small iconic presence in Delhi to a multinational chain of hotels and restaurants. He is the author of 4 successful books that have been internationally critically acclaimed and internationally awarded by the Gourmand World Cookbook Fair.

Books 
 Moti Mahal Tandoori Trail- 2004
 On the butter chicken trail-2010
 On the kabab trail- 2014
 On the dessert trail- 2017

References

External links
 Monish Gujral's Website

1965 births
Living people
Indian male television journalists
Indian food writers
Indian columnists
Indian television presenters
Indian restaurateurs
Indian chefs
Indian bloggers
People from Punjab, India